Migrant Workers (Supplementary Provisions) Convention, 1975, or Convention concerning Migrations in Abusive Conditions and the Promotion of Equality of Opportunity and Treatment of Migrant Workers is an International Labour Organization Convention for the rights of migrant workers. However unlike the United Nations Convention on the Protection of the Rights of All Migrant Workers and Members of Their Families, there are restrictions of migrant worker to be applied on Article 11.

It was established in 1975:
Having decided upon the adoption of certain proposals with regard to migrant workers,...
Article 1. Each Member for which this Convention in force undertake to respect the basic human rights of all migrant workers.
Article 11. (1)For this Convention the term migrant worker means a person who migrates or who has migrated from one country to another with a view to bring employed otherwise than on his own account and includes any person regularly admitted as a migrant worker.
(2) It does not apply to (a) frontier workers (b) artistes and members of liberal profession (c) seamen (d) persons coming specially for purpose of education

Ratifications
As of 2022, the convention has been ratified by 28 states. Yugoslavia is a former ratifying state.

External links 
Text.
Ratifications.

Anti-discrimination treaties
Migrant workers
International Labour Organization conventions
Treaties concluded in 1975
Treaties entered into force in 1978
Treaties of Albania
Treaties of Armenia
Treaties of the People's Republic of Benin
Treaties of Bosnia and Herzegovina
Treaties of Burkina Faso
Treaties of Cameroon
Treaties of the Comoros
Treaties of Cyprus
Treaties of Guinea
Treaties of Italy
Treaties of Kenya
Treaties of North Macedonia
Treaties of Montenegro
Treaties of Norway
Treaties of the Philippines
Treaties of Portugal
Treaties of San Marino
Treaties of Serbia and Montenegro
Treaties of Sierra Leone
Treaties of Slovenia
Treaties of Somalia
Treaties of Sweden
Treaties of Tajikistan
Treaties of Togo
Treaties of Uganda
Treaties of Venezuela
Treaties of Yugoslavia
1975 in labor relations